The Sam Poh Tong Temple (also known as the Three Buddhas Cave) is a Chinese temple built within a limestone cave and is the oldest and the main cave temple in Ipoh, Perak, Malaysia. The temple was built in a raw limestone cave in the mountains located about 5 km from the city centre and follows the Buddhist branch of Mahāyāna Buddhism.

History 
The cave which now became the temple gateway was founded by a monk from China in 1890 who walked through the area from Ipoh. The monk then decided to make the cave as his home and a place for meditation where he remained there until the end of his life. This was then continued by other monks and nuns who dedicated their lives to Buddha where a temple was then constructed in the 1950s.

Features 
From a steep climb of 246 steps to the cave opening, visitors can view the city of Ipoh and its surroundings. It is the largest cave temple in Malaysia and contains art work such as a reclining Buddha figure. The temple also offers visitors the opportunity to feed fish and feed or release turtles into its turtle pond as a means of balancing one's karma.

References

External links 
 

Religious buildings and structures completed in 1950
Chinese-Malaysian culture
Buddhist temples in Malaysia
Buildings and structures in Ipoh
Religious buildings and structures in Perak
Tourist attractions in Perak
Limestone caves
20th-century Buddhist temples
20th-century architecture in Malaysia